SS Anglia was a steam ship requisitioned for use as a hospital ship during the First World War. On 17 November 1915 she hit a mine laid by the German U-boat, UC-5.

History
Anglia was built by Wm Denny & Brothers of Dumbarton, Scotland for the London and North Western Railway and was delivered in 1900.  At first she was used on the Holyhead to Dublin North Wall service, then from 1908 on the Holyhead to Kingstown (later named Dún Laoghaire) service.  With the outbreak of war she was drafted as a hospital ship.

Sinking

On 17 November 1915 Anglia was returning from Calais to Dover, carrying 390 injured officers and soldiers. The nearby torpedo gunboat HMS Hazard helped evacuate the passengers and crew. Despite the assistance of the nearby collier Lusitania, 134 people died in the sinking. In October 2014, there were calls for the wreck of the ship to be designated a war grave and protected under the Protection of Military Remains Act, 1986.
In March 2017 the wreckage of the HMHS Anglia was declared an official war grave, making it illegal to remove or disturb any human remains at the wreck site.

See also
 List of hospital ships sunk in World War I

References

External links

Maritime incidents in 1915
Hospital ships in World War I
1899 ships
Ships built on the River Clyde
Ships sunk by mines
Ships of the London and North Western Railway
World War I shipwrecks in the English Channel
Protected Wrecks of the United Kingdom